The Lucky Show was an Australian television series which aired from 1959 to 1961 on Sydney station TCN-9. Chuck Faulkner was originally announced as host, but was replaced prior to the first broadcast with George Foster. The series was a mix of game show and variety show, and episodes aired in a 60-minute time-slot during daytime. In 1961, The Lucky Show and The Happy Show were merged to create Happy Go Lucky, which should not be confused with Melbourne series The Happy Go Lucky Show (1957-1959). It is not known if any kinescopes or video-tapes still exist of The Lucky Show.

References

External links
 

Nine Network original programming
English-language television shows
Black-and-white Australian television shows
Australian non-fiction television series
1959 Australian television series debuts
1961 Australian television series endings
Australian variety television shows
1950s Australian game shows
1960s Australian game shows